82nd meridian may refer to:

82nd meridian east, a line of longitude east of the Greenwich Meridian
82nd meridian west, a line of longitude west of the Greenwich Meridian